(Disturbance) is a 2006 Norwegian crime film starring Nicolai Cleve Broch and Ane Dahl Torp. It was directed by Stefan Faldbakken. It was screened in the Un Certain Regard section at the 2006 Cannes Film Festival.

Plot
A former delinquent, Petter (HP) becomes a policeman. He is so involved when he is infiltrated that he sometimes forgets that he is a cop. His mission is to arrest a drug dealer Marco.

Cast
 Nicolai Cleve Broch – Hans Petter
 Ane Dahl Torp – Mette
 Ahmed Zeyan – Marco
 Bjørn Floberg – Frank Hermansen
 Ingar Helge Gimle – Makker
 Eivind Sander – Henning
 Kim Sørensen – Anders
 Anne Krigsvoll – Mother
 Thorsten Flinck – Radovan
 Nicholas Hope – The dealer
 Bartek Kaminski – Vekteren
 Jørgen Emmanuel – Tim
 Anne Ryg – Avdelingsleder
 Heidi Gjermundsen – Lege (as Heidi Gjermundsen Broch)
 Marlene Vilberg – Danskens datter

References

External links

2006 films
2000s Norwegian-language films
2000s crime films
Films directed by Stefan Faldbakken
Norwegian crime films